Muhammad Iqbal (born 10 May 1929) is a Pakistani former sports shooter. He competed in the 25 metre pistol event at the 1960 Summer Olympics.

References

External links
 

1929 births
Possibly living people
Pakistani male sport shooters
Olympic shooters of Pakistan
Shooters at the 1960 Summer Olympics
Sportspeople from Kolkata